The Algiers-Skikda line is one of the two trunk lines in the Algerian railway network, the other being the Algiers-Oran line. The line hosts passenger services connecting Algiers station with either Annaba or Constantine, the two largest cities in eastern Algeria. The first segment of the line connected Constantine to the port of Skikda and opened on September 1, 1870, remaining isolated from the remainder of the Algerian network until the opening of the Algiers-Constantine segment in 1879 and further extensions on November 3, 1886.

Line description

Algiers-Thénia section 
The 53.5 kilometer section between Algiers and Thénia includes 10 kilometers shared with the Algiers-Oran line from Algiers station to the El Harrach wye. This segment has been electrified in 2009 (25,000 volt) and is double-track. Further upgrades are being applied to the line.

130 daily passenger trains use the portion shared with the Algiers-Oran line, while 63 trains a day continue east on further parts of the line. Commuter rail services using this portion of the Algiers-Skikda line connect Algiers to Houari Boumediene Airport and Thénia, among others.

Thénia-Constantine section 
The Thénia-Constantine is not electrified and is single track from Thénia to Bordj Bou Arréridj and from Ramdane Djamel to Skikda. The portion between Sétif and the town of El Guerrah (in the municipality of Ouled Rahmoun) is being upgraded by SNTF.

Services 
One day train connects Algiers and Constantine in 7 hours while a night train connects Algiers and Annaba. The namesake of this line, Skikda, is not served by passenger services anymore, requiring passengers to connect at the nearby Ramdane Djamel station.

Regional services connect Algiers to Sétif, Béjaïa (via the Béni Mansour-Bejaïa line), and M'Sila, Algeria.

Speeds 
Passenger services on this line operate at speeds of 70–80 km/h. The Bordj Bou Arreridj-Sétif segment sees trains reaching 100 km/h.

References 

Railway lines in Algeria